Vali Gujarati Gazal Award is a literary honour in Gujarat, India. The award was instituted in 2005 by Vali Gujarati Gazal Kendra, run by Government of Gujarat, to perpetuate the memory of 17th century poet Vali Gujarati. The Award is conferred annually to the Gujarati ghazal poets.

Recipients

References 

Awards established in 2005
2005 establishments in Gujarat
Gujarati literary awards